Pituitary stalk interruption syndrome (PSIS) is a congenital disorder characterised by the triad of an absent or exceedingly thin pituitary stalk, an ectopic or absent posterior pituitary and/or absent or hypoplastic anterior pituitary.

Presentation 
Affected individuals may present with hypoglycaemia during the neonatal period, or with growth retardation during childhood (those diagnosed in the neonatal period appear to be affected by a particularly severe form of the disorder). PSIS is a common cause of congenital hypopituitarism, and causes a permanent growth hormone deficit. Some PSIS-affected individuals may also present with adrenal hypoplasia (5–29%), diabetes insipidus (5–29%), primary amenorrhea (5–29%), hypothyroidism (30–79%), failure to thrive (80–99%), septooptic dysplasia (5–29%), and Fanconi anaemia. PSIS may be isolated, or, commonly, present with extra-pituitary malformations.

PSIS features in neonates (may) include:
 hypoglycaemia (30–79%)
 (prolonged) jaundice
 micropenis (30–79%)
 cryptorchidism (5–29%)
 delayed intellectual development
 death in infancy (5–29%)
 congenital abnormalities

PSIS features in later childhood (may) include:
 short stature (80–99%)
 seizures (5–29%)
 hypotension
 delayed intellectual development
 delayed puberty (30–79%)

PSIS is associated with a higher frequency of breech presentation, caesarean section, and/or low Apgar score, though these are likely consequences rather than causes.

Cause 
The cause of the condition is as of yet unknown. Rare genetic mutations may cause familial cases, however, these account for less than 5% of cases.

Diagnosis 
The diagnosis is confirmed through MRI.

Management 
Treatment should commence as soon as a diagnosis is established to avoid complications, and consists of hormone replacement, particularly with growth hormone.

Prognosis 
Prognosis is generally good in cases of prompt diagnosis and management. Delays may lead to seizures (due to hypoglycaemia), hypotension (due to cortisol deficiency), and/or intellectual disability (due to thyroid endocrine deficits). Due to the before-mentioned factors, mortality and morbidity is higher than that of the general population, particularly during the first two years of life.

Epidemiology 
The prevalence of PSIS is unknown, however, some 1,000 cases have been reported either with or without the full triad.

References

External links 

Congenital disorders of endocrine system
Congenital disorders of nervous system
Pituitary disorders
Syndromes affecting the endocrine system